The 2005 Louisville Cardinals football team represented the University of Louisville in the 2005 NCAA Division I-A football season. The team, led by Bobby Petrino in his third year at the school, played their home games in Papa John's Cardinal Stadium. They finished 9–3 in their first season as a member of the Big East Conference with a 5–2 conference record.

Season
The Cardinals finished the 2004 season with an 11–1 record, including a win in the 2004 Liberty Bowl. After the win, they were ranked 6th in the nation. The team was picked, by the Big East media, to finish first in the conference, and ranked 12th in the preseason polls.

Schedule

Roster

Coaching staff

References

Louisville
Louisville Cardinals football seasons
Louisville Cardinals football